WMXV (101.5 FM, "My 101.5") is a radio station licensed to St. Joseph, Tennessee. WMXV broadcasts as part of the Florence/Muscle Shoals, Alabama, Arbitron radio market. The station's format is hot adult contemporary music and its positioning statement is "More Music, More Variety".

The station is owned by Mike Self, through licensee Singing River Media Group, LLC.

Personalities on the station include D.L. Hughley and Keith Sweat.

The station's Program Director is T.C Kinkead.

On April 12, 2019, WMXV changed formats from urban adult contemporary to hot adult contemporary, branded as "My 101.5".

Previous logo

References

External links

MXV
Hot adult contemporary radio stations in the United States
Florence–Muscle Shoals metropolitan area
Radio stations established in 1991
1991 establishments in Tennessee